Acacia arbiana is a species of wattle that is endemic to Queensland.

Description
It has ribbed branchlets. The green, linear, straight phyllodes are narrowed into a long curved mucro. It flowers between July and August producing the solitary, axillary flower-heads are spherical and contain 24 to 30 golden yellow flowers.

Taxonomy
The species was first formally described by the botanist Leslie Pedley in 1999 as part of the work Notes on Acacia (Leguminosae: Mimosoideae) chiefly from northern Australia as published in the journal Austrobaileya. It was reclassified as Racosperma arbianum by Pedley in 2003 the transferred back to the genus Acacia in 2006.

Distribution
It is found in only a small area of eastern central Queensland to the east of Clermont where it is only found in Peak Range around the summits of Ropers and Scotts Peak. It is found among heath-like vegetation communities growing in rocky soils.

See also
 List of Acacia species

References

arbiana
Flora of Queensland
Taxa named by Leslie Pedley
Plants described in 1999